The Chicago Sting are a professional indoor soccer team based in Chicago. They are the second team to use this name.  This version of the Sting play in the Arena Soccer League while the original Chicago Sting played in the Major Indoor Soccer League in the 1982–83 season and again from 1984 to 1988.

History

The Original Sting
The Sting were experiencing financial challenges through the 1987–88 MISL season. In the spring of 1988, the owners explored the possibility of moving to Denver.
In July 1988, owner Lee Stern announced that the Sting had withdrawn from the MISL, citing falling attendances, failure to find new investors and concerns that the league was on the verge of collapse.

The Sting: Reborn
On May 20, 2021, the new Sting was officially announced as a charter teams in the new ASL.

References

Association football clubs established in 2021
Soccer clubs in Chicago
Indoor soccer clubs in the United States
2021 establishments in Illinois